Salt and Sandon railway station was a former British railway station opened by the Stafford and Uttoxeter Railway to serve the village of  Salt in Staffordshire in 1867.

Until 1904 it was known simply as "Salt" the name being changed to avoid confusion with Sandon and Salt station on the North Staffordshire Railway. Sandon was actually about two miles away, the station being nearer to Sandon Bank.

The Stafford and Uttoxeter Railway was purchased for £100,000 by the Great Northern Railway in July 1881 and the line subsequently passed into LNER ownership with Railway Grouping in 1923.

From Salt the line turned sharply south east towards Ingestre, before passing under the North Staffordshire Railway's main line from Stone to Colwich.

Passenger services finished in 1939.

References

Further reading

Disused railway stations in Staffordshire
Former Great Northern Railway stations
Railway stations in Great Britain opened in 1867
Railway stations in Great Britain closed in 1939